Jan Władysław Obłąk (born 26 May 1913 in Borzęcin; died 16 December 1988) was a Polish Catholic Priest, Bishop of Warmia from 1982 until his death in 1988.

External links 
 Jan Obłąk in the Hierarchy of the Roman Catholic Church
 Archdiocese Warmia  (Polish)

1913 births
1988 deaths
Bishops of Warmia
20th-century Roman Catholic bishops in Poland